"Walking Away" is a song by English singer Craig David. It was written by David and Mark Hill and released as the third single from his debut studio album, Born to Do It (2000), on 20 November 2000. It reached number three in the United Kingdom and number one in New Zealand, where it became the most successful song of 2001 according to the Recording Industry Association of New Zealand (now Recorded Music NZ).

In 2008, the track was re-recorded for David's Greatest Hits compilation, released in November 2008 in the United Kingdom. The new versions each feature a different artist: Lynnsha on the French version, Nek on the Italian version, Álex Ubago on the Spanish version and Monrose on the German version. Monrose's vocals were sung in English rather than in German, whereas the other artists sang in their native languages.

Music video

Original version 
There are two versions of the video. The European music video begins with David with his girlfriend in a car, where she is seen yelling at him. He turns on the radio and the song starts. He then gets out of the car and the landscape continually changes, showing different places. This was directed by Max & Dania. The U.S. version starts with an acapella sample of the Ignorants remix, leading into the actual song. The video shows him "walking away" from troubles in his life: a flooded apartment, a fire in his 67 Camaro convertible, electrical problems at the train station, and a tornado at the end of the video. This was directed by Lenny Bass.

Greatest Hits version 
New versions of the songs were recorded and shot in 2008, and it features Lynnsha on the French version, Nek on the Italian version, Álex Ubago on the Spanish version and Monrose on the German version. The video was shot in black and white, and the guest artist is seen in some scenes. Sometimes, the two singers are seen together.

Track listings 

UK CD1
 "Walking Away"
 "Human"
 "7 Days" (live vibe in Amsterdam)

UK CD2
 "Walking Away" (radio edit)
 "Walking Away" (Ignorants remix featuring Trell)
 "Walking Away" (DJ Chunky remix featuring MC B-Live)
 "Walking Away" (Treats (Better Day) remix)

UK cassette single
 "Walking Away"
 "Human"
 "Walking Away" (Ignorants remix featuring Trell)

European CD single
 "Walking Away" – 3:27
 "7 Days" (live in Stockholm) – 7:00

Australian CD single
 "Walking Away" – 3:27
 "Human" – 4:01
 "7 Days" (live in Stockholm) – 7:00
 "Walking Away" (Ignorants remix featuring Trell) – 5:16
 "Walking Away" (DJ Chunky remix featuring MC B-Live) – 5:43
 "Walking Away" (Treats Better Day remix) – 5:22

US 7-inch single
 "Walking Away"
 "Time to Party"

US 12-inch single
A1. "Walking Away" (album version) – 3:26
A2. "Walking Away" (album instrumental) – 3:26
A3. "Walking Away" (album acapella) – 3:03
B1. "Walking Away" (Ignorants remix featuring Trell) – 5:18
B2. "Walking Away" (Ignorants remix instrumental) – 4:43
B3. "Walking Away" (Ignorants remix acapella) – 3:56

Charts

Weekly charts

Year-end charts

Certifications

Release history

References 

2000 singles
2000 songs
2001 singles
2002 singles
2008 singles
Atlantic Records singles
Contemporary R&B ballads
Craig David songs
Nek songs
Number-one singles in New Zealand
Number-one singles in Poland
Shock Records singles
Songs written by Craig David
Songs written by Mark Hill (musician)